Two months before the release of their fifth full-length album, Year Zero, industrial rock band Nine Inch Nails began a new tour, officially called Performance 2007. The tour initially started off as a 'best-of' tour (since no songs from Year Zero were played at the first few days) but later transformed into a direct Year Zero support tour.

Prior to the beginning of the tour, Trent Reznor in an interview described it as an opportunity to play with the same line-up again, visiting some places the band did not play in before and revisiting music from all the different areas of Nine Inch Nails rather than focusing entirely on the new album.

The production on this tour was minimal so the heaviest setlist rotation in the band's history occurred, covering about 50 songs from all their albums.

Songlist

Band line-up

Trent Reznor – Lead vocals, guitar, keyboards, tambourine, mbira
Aaron North – Guitar, keyboards, backup vocals
Jeordie White – Bass guitar, guitar, keyboards, backup vocals
Alessandro Cortini – Keyboards, programming, guitar, bass guitar, backup vocals
Josh Freese – Drums

Tour legs

Europe (Spring Tour)

Notes
Two Year Zero songs made their debut on this leg ("Survivalism" and "The Beginning of the End"), as well as a few old, never before played live songs: "Last" from Broken, "We're in This Together" from The Fragile and a deconstructed version of "The Fragile" from Still. At a show in Madrid, Spain, ten tracks from The Downward Spiral were performed, the first seven of which were performed in their exact order on the album; three of these ("Heresy", "Ruiner", "The Becoming") returned to the setlist for the first time since the Self-Destruct tour.

During a concert in Lisbon, Portugal, a USB flash drive was found in a men's bathroom stall containing an intentionally leaked high-quality MP3 of the track "My Violent Heart", a song from the then-unreleased album, Year Zero.  A second USB drive was found after a concert in Barcelona, containing the track "Me, I'm Not".

On April 18, Nine Inch Nails fans received in-game telephone-calls in which they were invited to a "resistance meeting" in Los Angeles.  At the meeting, fans attended a fictional Art is Resistance meeting, and were later rewarded by an unannounced performance by Nine Inch Nails. The concert was cut short as the meeting was raided by a fictional SWAT team and the audience was rushed out of the building.

Support acts
 The Popo
 Ladytron

Dates

Australia / Asia (Spring Tour)

Notes
This leg featured the same production as the previous European leg, but was more focused on Year Zero, as it had 5-6 Year Zero songs in each show setlist, while previously there were no more than two. "HYPERPOWER!", "The Good Soldier", "Me, I'm Not" and "Capital G" made their live debut on this leg.

Support act
 Serena Maneesh

Dates

Europe (Summer / Fall tour and festival dates)

Notes
This leg featured one more song from Year Zero ("The Great Destroyer") and more extensive production, which included a traditional major visual section in the middle of the show, this time created for "Me, I'm Not", "The Great Destroyer", "Eraser" and "Only". The former two were played by Reznor, North and Cortini as a 3-piece, using a combination of live guitars and pre-programmed samples triggered onstage with computers and manipulated in real time using Ableton software.

Support acts
 Intacto
 Theodor Bastard
 Noisecut
 The Dandy Warhols
 Ladytron
 Alec Empire

Dates

Asia / Australia / North America

Notes
This particular leg included the band's first ever performance in China.

The Honolulu Star-Bulletin reported that the September 18 show in Honolulu would be the last performance of the current incarnation of the Nine Inch Nails live band. Reznor told the newspaper "at this point, I want to switch things around a bit. Nine Inch Nails as a rock band configuration, we've done it and we've done it again. I see other ways I can present the material in concert, more challenging, something new. I don't want it to go stale".  In the same article, Reznor also admitted that "the idea of five guys playing loud music [for] two hours... has got to change once finances come into play, especially performing in markets outside of the mainland U.S. I want to whittle things down".

Support acts
 Unkle
 The Lovesong
 White Rose Movement

Dates

References

External links
 Official website

2007 concert tours
Nine Inch Nails concert tours